Graham Township is a township in Johnson County, Iowa, USA.

History
Graham Township was organized in 1857. It is named after John Graham, an early settler.

Demographics 
As of the 2020 Census, there were 494 people and 256 households in the community. The population density was 16.30 inhabitants per square mile (5.37/km2). 

The median age in the city was 53.9 years.

Politics

References

Townships in Johnson County, Iowa
Townships in Iowa
1857 establishments in Iowa
Populated places established in 1857